This is a list of divinities native to Japanese beliefs and religious traditions. Many of these are from Shinto, while others were imported via Buddhism or Taoism and were "integrated" into Japanese mythology and folklore.

Major kami

Amaterasu-Ōmikami, she is the goddess of the sun as well as the purported ancestress of the Imperial Household of Japan. Her name means "Shines from Heaven" or "the great kami who shine Heaven". For many reasons, one among them being her ties to the Imperial family, she is often considered (though not officially) to be the "primary god" of Shinto.
 Ame-no-Uzume ( or ) Commonly called Uzume, she is the goddess of dawn and revelry in Shinto. 
He is often depicted as an oni with a bag slung over his back.
 Hachiman is the god of war and the divine protector of Japan and its people. Originally an agricultural deity, he later became the guardian of the Minamoto clan. His symbolic animal and messenger is the dove.
 Inari Ōkami The god or goddess of rice and fertility. Their messengers and symbolic animal are foxes .  They are often identified with Ukanomitama and Buddhist deity Dakiniten.
 Ninigi-no-Mikoto Commonly called Ninigi, he was the grandson of Amaterasu. His great-grandson was Kan'yamato Iwarebiko, later known as Emperor Jimmu, the first emperor of Japan.
Ōmononushi in the Nihongi, Ōmononushi was considered an alternate name for Ōkuninushi. But, it appears that the two were separate kami.
 Ōkuninushi A god of nation-building, farming, business, and medicine.
 Omoikane The deity of wisdom and intelligence, who is always called upon to "ponder" and give good counsel in the deliberations of the heavenly deities.
 Raijin is the god of thunder and lightning and is often paired with Fūjin. As with the latter, Raijin is usually depicted as an oni.
 Ryūjin Some versions consider him and Ōwatatsumi as the same god, he is a dragon, as well as god of the sea.
 Suijin The God of Water.
 Susanoo-no-Mikoto ( or ) is a god of storms, as well as the ruler of the sea in some cases. He is also somewhat of a trickster god, as Japanese mythology extensively documents the "sibling rivalry" between him and Amaterasu. Susanoo was also responsible for the slaying of the monster Yamata no Orochi and the subsequent discovery of the sacred sword Kusanagi.
 Takemikazuchi, (/) known as a god of thunder and the god of swords.
 Takeminakata, god of wind, water and agriculture, as well as a patron of hunting and warfare.
Tamanoya, a kami believed to be the creator of Yasakani no Magatama.
 Toyotama-hime was the daughter of Ryūjin and the grandmother of Jimmu. It is said that after she gave birth to her son, she turned into a dragon and disappeared.
 Tsukuyomi-no-Mikoto ( or ) is the god of the moon. He killed Ukemochi, out of disgust and anger in the way she had prepared a meal. This caused Amaterasu never to face him again, causing the sun and moon to be in different parts of the sky.

Kamiyonanayo

 Izanagi: was a creation deity; he makes up the seventh generation of the Kamiyonanayo, along with his wife and sister, Izanami.
 Izanami: was a creation deity; she makes up the seventh generation of the Kamiyonanayo, along with her husband and brother, Izanagi.
Kuninotokotachi was a deity classified as a hitorigami. He was, by himself, the first generation of the Kamiyonanayo. He was considered one of the first two gods, according to the Kojiki, or one of the first three gods, according to the Nihon Shoki.
 Omodaru and Ayakashikone: ( and ) Sixth generation of the Kamiyonanayo.
Otonoji and Otonobe: ( and ) Fifth generation of the Kamiyonanayo.
Toyokumono: was a hitorigami, and constituted the second generation of the Kamiyonanayo.
Tsunuguhi and Ikuguhi: ( and ) Fourth generation of the Kamiyonanayo.
Uhijini and Suhijini: ( and ) Third generation of the Kamiyonanayo.

Minor kami
 Amatsu-Mikaboshi, the kami of stars who existed before the Kotoamatsukami.
 Amanozako
 Amatsumara is the kami of iron-working.
 Ajisukitakahikone is a kami of agriculture and thunder.
 Amatsuhikone, considered the third son of Amaterasu.
 Ame-no-hohi considered the second son of Amaterasu.
Ame-no-Naemasu, said to be son of Futsunushi.
 Ame-no-Koyane ( or ) A male deity, he is considered the "First in Charge of Divine Affairs," as well as the aide to the first Emperor of Japan.  He is also considered to be the ancestor of the Fujiwara family.
 Ame-no-oshihomimi
 Ame-no-wakahiko God of grains
 Atago Gongen
 Ame-no-Tajikarao, in many versions is the kami that pull Amaterasu out of Amano-Iwato.
 Azumi-no-isora is a kami of the seashore. He is considered to be the ancestor of the Azumi people.
 Amenohoakari, a sun and agriculture god.
 Dojin, is a Japanese god of earth, land, and/or soil.
 Futodama is a kami who performed a divination when Amaterasu hid in a cave.
 Futsunushi Main deity at Katori Shrine.
 Haniyasu no kami, two deities born from Izanami's feces.
 Hoderi was a deity of the bounty of the sea and enchanted fisherman.
 Hoori
 Isetsuhiko, is a god of the wind.
 Ishikori-dome no Mikoto, the god of metalworking.
 Kaya-no-hime, the goddess of vegetation, grass and fields.
 Kawaya no Kami, kami of the toilet.
 Kawa-no-Kami a god of rivers.
 Kagu-tsuchi, the kami of fire.
 Kanayago-kami/Kanayako-kami, a Kami of metal and metal-working, who, as believed by blacksmiths, lives mainly in Chugoku Region.  Similar to Inari, Kanayago can be, either, male or female.  
 Kisshōten, goddess of good fortune; also known as Kichijōten, Kisshoutennyo, and as Kudokuten, Kisshōten is the Shinto adaption, via Buddhism, from the Hindu goddess, Lakshmi.  
 Konjin
 Kotoshironushi
 Kuebiko, the god of knowledge and agriculture, represented in Japanese mythology as a scarecrow who cannot walk but has comprehensive awareness.
 Kuraokami is a legendary Japanese dragon and Shinto deity of rain and snow.
 Kushinadahime
 Kukurihime no Kami, a goddess enshrined at Shirayama Hime Shrine.
 Kuzuryū, minor water deity.
 Kōjin, is the god of fire, the hearth, and the kitchen.
 Kajin, is a god of fire.
 Kukunochi, believed to be the ancestor of trees. 
 Mitsuhanome, water kami. 
 Moreya
 Nakisawame, kami born from Izanagi's tear after his wife's death.
 Nesaku, a star god.
 Nigihayahi-no-mikoto
 Oshirasama
 Shinatsuhiko, a kami of wind.
 Sukuna-Biko-Na A small deity of medicine and rain, who created and solidified the land with Ōkuninushi.
 Sumiyoshi sanjin, the gods of the sea and sailing.
 Sarutahiko Ōkami, a kami of the Earth that guided Ninigi to the Japanese islands.
 Seidai Myōjin, god of sports, enshrined at Shiramine Shrine in Kyoto, especially worshipped for kemari and football.
 Tajimamori, god who obtained the tokijiku no kagu no mi in Tokoyo-no-kuni, and hailed as "god of wagashi" (sweets, confections).
 Tamayori-hime, mother of Emperor Jimmu.
 Takitsuhiko a kami believed to bring forth rain.
 Tatsuta-hime and Tatsuta-hiko, pair of wind kami who bring forth autumn.
 Ta-no-Kami, is a kami who is believed to observe the harvest of rice plants or to bring a good harvest, by Japanese farmers.
 Toyouke-Ōmikami, goddess of food. She is also the daughter of Wakumusubi.
 Torento-no-kami, Deity of support and gratitude.
 Ugajin, a harvest and fertility kami represented with the body of a snake and head of a man or woman. They may be derived from Ukanomitama.
 Ugayafukiaezu, the father of Japan's first emperor.
 Ukanomitama, a kami associated with food and agriculture.
 Ukemochi, is considered a goddess of food. After she disgorged food from her body she had been killed by a disgusted Tsukuyomi or Susanoo.
 Watatsumi some versions is considered the same god as Ryujin.
 Wakumusubi, a kami of agriculture.
 Wakahiru-me, a kami of the rising sun, considered the daughter or younger sister of Amaterasu.

Yama-no-Kami 

 Konohanasakuya-hime, the wife of Ninigi and daughter of Ōyamatsumi, and great-grandmother of Jimmu. She is also known as the goddess of Mount Fuji.
 Ōyamatsumi, an elder brother of Amaterasu, and an important god who rules mountain. Also, the father of Konohanasakuya-hime.

Kotoamatsukami 

 Amenominakanushi - Central Master
 Takamimusubi - High Creator
 Kamimusubi - Divine Creator
 Umashi'ashikabihikoji - Energy
 Amenotokotachi - Heaven

People worshipped as kami 

This section includes historical people worshipped as kami.

 Shōtoku Taishi was sometimes worshipped by Shintoists in Prince's Hall ( Taishido) as the Kami of building trade and easy birth, like in the Hokai-ji of Kamakura.
 Tokugawa Ieyasu enshrined at Nikkō Tōshō-gū and similar shrines.
 Toyotomi Hideyoshi enshrined at Toyokuni-jinja.
Tenjin The god of scholarship, he is the deified Sugawara no Michizane. Subsequent disasters in Heiankyo were attributed to his angered spirit.
Oda Nobunaga enshrined at Kenkun-jinja.
Emperor Jimmu the first emperor. Enshrined at Kashihara Shrine. 
Emperor Meiji, and Empress Shōken. Enshrined at Meiji Shrine. 
All Emperors and Empresses of Japan are technically worshipped because of their descent from Amaterasu Ōmikami, but there are many esteemed and highly revered ones who are not enshrined.

Buddhism
 
 Aizen Myō-ō, a Wisdom King known to transform earthly desires (love/lust) into spiritual awakening.
 Amida Nyorai ( or ), commonly referred to as Amida-butsu, he is the primary Buddha of the Pure Land school of Buddhism. He is believed to possess infinite meritorious qualities and is known as the "Lord of the Beyond and the Afterlife." He is one of the Five Dhyani Buddhas.
 Daruma, traditionally held in Buddhist mythology to be the founder of Zen Buddhism, as well as the founder of Shaolin Kung Fu. One legend reports that after years of facing a wall in meditation, Bodhidharma's legs and arms fall off due to atrophy. Daruma dolls were created in honor of this legend.
 Fudō Myōō, a fierce and wrathful Wisdom King who protects all by burning away impediments and defilements, and aiding them towards enlightenment.
 Idaten, guardian of Buddhist monasteries and monks.
 Jizō, a Bodhisattva known as the protector of the vulnerable, especially children, travelers, and expectant mothers. He is also regarded as the patron deity of deceased children and aborted fetuses and the savior of hell-beings. His statues are a common sight, especially by roadsides and in graveyards.
 Kangiten, god (deva) of bliss.
 Kannon, a Bodhisattva associated with compassion. Commonly known in English as the "Goddess of Mercy."
 Yakushi Nyorai, a Buddha known for healing and medicine.

Seven Lucky Gods

The  are:Benzaiten ( or ) Also known as Benten or Benzaitennyo, she is the goddess of everything that flows: words (and knowledge, by extension), speech, eloquence, and music. Said to be the third daughter of the dragon-king of Munetsuchi, over the course of years, she has gone from being a protective deity of Japan to one who bestows good fortune upon the state and its people. She was derived from Saraswati, the equivalent Hindu goddess.
Bishamonten Also called Bishamon or Tamonten, he is the god of fortunate warriors and guards, as well as the punisher of criminals. Said to live halfway down the side of Mount Sumeru, the small pagoda he carries symbolizes the divine treasure house that he both guards and gives away its contents. Bishamonten is the Japanese equivalent of the Indian Kubera and the Buddhist Vaishravana.Daikokuten Often shortened to simply Daikoku, he is variously considered to be the god of wealth (more specifically, the harvest), or of the household (particularly the kitchen). He is recognized by his wide face, smile, and flat black hat. He is often portrayed holding a golden mallet, seated on bales of rice, with mice nearby (which signify plentiful food).
Ebisu (or ) The sole member of the gods believed to have originated in Japan, he was originally known as Hiruko, the first child of Izanagi and Izanami. Said to be born without bones, he eventually overcame his handicaps to become the mirthful and auspicious Ebisu (hence one of his titles, "The Laughing God"). He is often depicted holding a rod and a large red sea bream or sea bass. Jellyfish are also associated with this god, and the fugu restaurants of Japan will often incorporate Yebisu in their motif.Fukurokuju''' Often confused with Jurōjin, he is the god of wisdom and longevity and said to be an incarnation of the Southern Polestar. He is a star god accompanied by a crane and a turtle, which are considered to be symbols of longevity, and also sometimes accompanied by a black deer.  The sacred book tied to his staff is said to contain the lifespan of every person on Earth.
Hotei Best known in the Western world as the Laughing Buddha, Hotei is likely the most popular of the gods. His image graces many temples, restaurants and amulets. Originally based on a Chinese Chan monk, Hotei has become a deity of contentment and abundance.
Jurōjin Also known as Gama, he represents longevity. He is often seen with a fan and a staff and accompanied by a black deer.

The goddess Kichijōten, also known as Kisshoutennyo, is sometimes considered to be one of the seven gods, replacing either Jurōjin or Fukurokuju. She embodies happiness, fertility and beauty.  Daikoku sometimes manifests as a female known as Daikokunyo or Daikokutennyo.  When Kisshoutennyo is counted among the seven Fukujin and Daikoku is regarded in feminine form, all three of the Hindu Tridevi goddesses are represented in the Fukujin.

See also

 Binbōgami
 Hitorigami
 Kamiumi
 Kunado-no-Kami
 Mishaguji
 Munakata Taisha
 Shinigami
 Yakusanoikazuchi: thunder deities born from Izanami's body
 Zhong Kui
 Zuijin
 Family tree of Japanese deities
 Glossary of Shinto
 List of legendary creatures from Japan

References

External links

Glossary(kana) – Encyclopedia of Shinto

 
Deities
Japanese
Deities